Kristin Gierisch (born 20 August 1990 in Zwickau) is a German athlete specialising in the triple jump. She won the silver medal at the 2016 World Indoor Championships, 2018 European Championships and gold at the 2017 European Indoor Championships . She also finished fourth at the 2015 European Indoor Championships and ninth at the 2014 European Championships.

Her personal bests in the event are 14.45 metres outdoors (-0,5 m/s; Berlin 2018) and 14.46 metres indoors (Prague 2015).

Competition record

1Did not start in the final.

References

External links

 
 

1990 births
Living people
People from Zwickau
Sportspeople from Saxony
German female triple jumpers
Olympic female triple jumpers
Olympic athletes of Germany
Athletes (track and field) at the 2016 Summer Olympics
World Athletics Championships athletes for Germany
European Athletics Indoor Championships winners
German national athletics champions
Athletes (track and field) at the 2020 Summer Olympics